WELJ (104.7 FM) branded as "104.7 WELJ", is a commercial radio station licensed to Montauk, New York, and serving Eastern Long Island, and Southeastern Connecticut.  It is owned by BOLD Broadcasting and airs a soft adult contemporary radio format. Its radio studios and offices are on Waverly Avenue in Holtsville, New York.

WELJ has an effective radiated power (ERP) of 6,000 watts. Its transmitter is off Montauk Highway (N.Y. State Route 27) near Lincoln Road in Montauk.

History

WBEA, WMOS and WXLM
The station first signed on the air on February 19, 1993, as WBEA. It launched with an adult contemporary music format near identical to that which had been heard on WHFM (prior to its change to a relay of WBAB the previous year). However, within a year the format evolved to a Hot Adult Contemporary format with the Beach Radio name.

Beach Radio saw success in not just targeting Eastern Long Island but also seeking advertisers across Long Island Sound in the New London, Connecticut market where it delivers a listenable, though not local-quality signal. 

When then-WBEA owner AAA Entertainment purchased WBAZ (101.7 FM) and WBSQ (102.5 FM) in 2000, the company began to realign its formats among its signals.  After moving WBAZ to WBSQ's signal in May 2001, it was announced that WBEA would move to the former WBAZ frequency at 101.7 MHz with 104.7 becoming a New London rimshot. During the interim period, 104.7 had the temporary WCSO call letters.

In June 2001, AAA entered a deal with the Mohegan Sun casino to program and operate the then-WCSO, with AAA keeping technical operations. With the deal came a new format, classic rock, and the new call sign of WMOS. In 2003, AAA Entertainment sold WMOS and sister WWKX in the Providence market to Citadel Broadcasting.

On March 17, 2008, 104.7 and sister station 102.3 made a frequency swap. WXLM and its talk radio format was moved to 104.7, while WMOS and its Classic Rock format was moved to 102.3.

WELJ
On September 21, 2010, WXLM changed its call sign to WELJ as part of a pending format change.  The WXLM call sign was moved to 980 AM, replacing the historic call sign WSUB.  Shortly after, the News/Talk format began to simulcast on 980 AM with frequent announcements that WXLM is moving to 980 AM.

On November 3, 2010, WELJ broke away from its simulcast with 980 AM and changed its format to Hot Adult Contemporary. Known on-air as "The New 104-7 WELJ," the station promoted 10,000 songs in-a-row, non-stop with zero commercials through the month of November. Although it was anticipated to be a full simulcast of sister station 95.5 WPLJ in New York City, the station had its own identity with local DJs such as Jody, Johnny Mac, Paula Wyn and Joshua Spatafore, along with plans to add "The Big Show with Scott & Todd" (Scott Shannon and Todd Pettingill) from WPLJ for its morning show.

Volt Radio
Citadel merged with Cumulus Media on September 16, 2011.  To comply with Federal Communications Commission ownership restrictions, WELJ had to be spun off by Cumulus Media. It was then transferred to Volt Radio, LLC.

On November 3, 2014, WELJ dropped its Hot AC format and flipped back to a simulcast, this time of WNSH in Newark, New Jersey, which carried a country music format as "Nash FM 94.7", with the simulcast evidently only being noted in station identifications. On August 31, 2015, WELJ dropped its simulcast with WNSH and rebranded as "104.7 Nash Icon".

Soft AC
On July 19, 2016, Joule Broadcasting announced that WELJ would be sold to BOLD Broadcasting, LLC The station was purchased by two college students, Matthew Glaser and Andrew Adams, who were said to be the youngest station owners in the country. The sale was completed on November 1, 2016. At that time, WELJ switched to Christmas music and announced that a new format would launch on December 26 at noon.

At the promised time, WELJ launched a soft adult contemporary and oldies format as "104.7 WELJ". The first song under the new format was "Easy" by The Commodores.

References

External links

ELJ
East Hampton (town), New York
Mass media in Suffolk County, New York
Soft adult contemporary radio stations in the United States
Oldies radio stations in the United States
Radio stations established in 1993
1993 establishments in New York (state)